Ōtaki Castle may refer to: 

 Ōtaki Castle (Chiba) - a Japanese castle located in Ōtaki, Chiba
 Ōtaki Castle (Fukui) - a Japanese castle located in Echizen, Fukui